Tahuneh (also Romanized as Ţāhūneh) is a village in Forg Rural District, Forg District, Darab County, Fars Province, Iran. At the 2006 census, its population was 707, in 153 families.

References 

Populated places in Darab County